Shashank (born 1944) is a former foreign secretary of India. He was secretary from December 2003 to July 2004. He also served as India's Ambassador to Denmark, South Korea and Libya.

He is one son of Madan Mohan and Kamala.
He married Kalpana they have one daughter and one son.
He is Master of Science in Physics. 
In 1966 he joined the Indian Foreign Service.
From 1968 to 1971 he was 3r Sec/2nd Secy in the City of Brussels (Belgium).
From 1972 to 1973 he was 1st Secy in Hanoi.
From 1974 to 1976 he was Under Sec/Dep Sec in the Ministry of External Affairs (India).
From 1976 to 1979 he was Dep Sec in the Permanent Mission of India before the Headquarters of the United Nations New York City
From 1979 to 1982 he was 1st Secy/Counsellor in Cairo.
From 1982 to 1986 he was minister in Islamabad.
From 1986 to 1991 he was Joint Secretary in charge of the Passport Office of the Ministry of External Affairs (India).
From 1991 to 1994 he was Ambassador to Tripoli (Libya) and concurrently High Commissioner to Valletta (Malta).
In 1994 he was Ambassador to Seoul (South Korea).
From 1994 to 1999 he was Ambassador to Jakarta (Indonesia).
From March 1999 to 2001 he was Ambassador to Copenhagen (Denmark).
From 19 November 2003 to 31 July 2004 he was Foreign Secretary (India).

References

Indian Foreign Secretaries
Living people
Ambassadors of India to Denmark
Ambassadors of India to South Korea
Ambassadors of India to Libya
1944 births
People from Meerut